Arrah Lee Gaul (1888-1980), was an American painter. She was the first woman to have a solo exhibition at the Philadelphia Art Club. Gaul was the official artist of the Philadelphia Sesqui-Centennial and an original member of the Philadelphia Ten.

Biography
Gaul was born in 1888 in Philadelphia, Pennsylvania. She attended the Philadelphia School of Design, studying under Elliott Daingerfield, and Henry B. Snell. 

Gaul pursued additional studies at the University of Pennsylvania before returning in 1921 to teach at the Philadelphia School of Design and she eventually became the head of the art department there.

In 1917 she participated in the inaugural exhibition of the Philadelphia Ten. She also exhibited nationally at the Art Institute of Chicago, the Pennsylvania Academy of the Fine Arts and the National Academy of Design in New York. She was the first woman to have a solo exhibition at the Philadelphia Art Club. Internationally, she exhibited at Beaux Arts Gallery in London, the Paris Salon of 1931 and the Grand Palais des Champs Elysees.

Gaul frequently traveled to foreign locations to paint including Greece, Italy, Algiers, China, Hong Kong, Thailand and India.

Gaul died in Philadelphia in 1980.

References

External links
 images of Arrah Lee Gaul's paintings on artNet

1888 births 
1980 deaths
20th-century American women artists
Philadelphia School of Design for Women alumni
American women painters
Painters from Pennsylvania
Artists from Philadelphia